This is a list of Estonian television related events from 1976.

Events

Debuts

Television shows

Ending this year

Births
26 April - Elisabet Reinsalu, actress
22 May - Külli Teetamm, actress
6 August - Andero Ermel, actor 
16 August - Kadri Rämmeld, actress
26 September - Kersti Heinloo, actress

Deaths